Hoodi, once a village, is now an expanding district in Bangalore, India. It is on the Whitefield - International Tech Park main road. 

With the move of IT companies into the area, there is much construction of commercial and residential property. Software companies in the area include Oracle, SAP, TCS, IBM and Genisys Group.
There are more companies established here at Hoodi during 2018 to 2021 which are SolarClue, Varistor Technologies Pvt Ltd, Fabzen, Milmila and many more.
Hoodi has a government school that is more than 90 years old, which recently had constructed a stadium.

Access 
Railway

Hoodi Halt railway station opened in 2016 to cater for local IT commuters. The station is located between Krishnarajpuram and Whitefield railway stations.

Bus service

Hoodi is well connected by Bangalore Metropolitan Transport Corporation bus service, which runs both air-conditioned and non-air-conditioned buses.

References

Neighbourhoods in Bangalore